"Repentance" is the 159th episode of the American science fiction television series Star Trek: Voyager airing on the UPN network. It is the 13th episode of the seventh season.

Set in the 24th century, the series follows the adventures of the Starfleet and Maquis crew of the starship USS Voyager after they were stranded in the Delta Quadrant far from the rest of the Federation. In this episode, Voyager assists a ship in distress and ends up ferrying its passengers: criminals en route to their executions.

"Repentance" aired on the United Paramount Network (UPN) on January 31, 2001.

Plot
Voyager responds to a distress call, beaming all the people off a Nygean ship which is about to explode. Most are sent to Voyagers cargo bay, but two of them are sent to sickbay, where one takes Seven of Nine (Jeri Lynn Ryan) hostage. He is forced away from Seven and attempts to take the Doctor (Robert Picardo) hostage. This fails as the Doctor, as a hologram, is invulnerable to a common knife.

It turns out the ship Voyager rescued was carrying prisoners to a facility where they are scheduled to be executed. Since there is no capital punishment in the Federation, the crew are uncomfortable with the situation, but the Prime Directive forbids them from interfering. They provide cages for the prisoners, who are treated brutally by the Nygean guards. Neelix (Ethan Phillips) insists that the prisoners must be fed and the Doctor insists they must receive proper medical care. Seven considers this a waste of resources, since the prisoners are going to be killed anyway, but the guards agree to allow the prisoners to have meals.

After a particularly brutal beating by a guard, one of the prisoners, Iko, is seriously wounded. The Voyager guards are forced to rescue Iko by drawing weapons on the Nygean guards. Captain Janeway (Kate Mulgrew) subsequently orders Voyagers security personnel take over guarding the prisoners. The Nygeans protest but Janeway gives them no choice.

Iko undergoes a medical procedure in which Borg nanoprobes are injected into his body; not only do the probes repair his injuries, they also seem to have restored the parts of his brain responsible for empathy, and he begins to feel remorse for his crime.

At first, Iko wants to be executed for all he has done, but he becomes close to Seven, who sees in him a reflection of her own struggles for atonement for all she did as a Borg. Since under Nygean law, the victim's family decides the punishment for all crimes, Iko eventually appeals to his own victim's family for leniency. He tells them that he is cured, is sorry for what he has done, and hopes to start a new life on Voyager. The family denies his request.

Meanwhile, Neelix becomes friendly with a Benkaran prisoner named Joleg, who explains minority Benkarans are subjected to racial profiling by Nygeans. Joleg persuades Neelix to get a letter through to his brother, but this turns out to be a ruse - Joleg has hidden Voyagers coordinates inside the letter, and the ship is attacked by others of Joleg's race. Joleg has organized a prison break so his co-conspirators can free him, but the plot is foiled by the Voyager crew. Neelix, who understands he was being manipulated, turns his back on Joleg.

Response
This episode's allegorical look at the American prison system was somewhat controversial with Trek fans, with some accusing it of being too liberal and some accusing it of being too conservative: on the one hand, the Iko plotline establishes that Iko was a sick man, and with treatment he could have been a productive member of society. On the other hand, while Joleg's stories of racial profiling may be true, Joleg himself is revealed as a manipulative person, unworthy of Neelix's trust.

Reception
SyFy recommends this episode for their Seven of Nine binge-watching guide.

Home media releases 
On December 21, 2003, this episode was released on DVD as part of a Season 7 boxset; Star Trek Voyager: Complete Seventh Season.

References

External links
 

Star Trek: Voyager (season 7) episodes
2001 American television episodes